St Ignatius Roman Catholic Church and Convent is a heritage-listed Roman Catholic church and convent at 3-7 Meek Street, Bourke, Bourke Shire, New South Wales, Australia. The property is owned by the Diocese of Wilcannia-Forbes, and used by the Parish of Bourke. It was added to the New South Wales State Heritage Register on 2 April 1999.

History 

St Ignatius Roman Catholic Church is the oldest documented building in Bourke, opening in April 1874.

The wrought iron St Ignatius Convent building was built in 1896.

In 2015, the convent and church received $150,000 in state government funding to return the convent to its 1924 state, remove inappropriate additions and balcony infill, and repair deteriorating woodwork, while weatherproofing both church and convent.

Heritage listing 
St Ignatius Roman Catholic Church and Convent was listed on the New South Wales State Heritage Register on 2 April 1999.

See also 

 List of Roman Catholic churches in New South Wales

References

Attribution

External links

 

Bourke
Bourke, New South Wales
Roman Catholic churches in New South Wales
Roman Catholic Diocese of Wilcannia–Forbes
Articles incorporating text from the New South Wales State Heritage Register
Convents in Australia
Roman Catholic churches completed in 1874
1874 establishments in Australia
Victorian architecture in New South Wales
Gothic Revival architecture in New South Wales
Gothic Revival church buildings in Australia
19th-century Roman Catholic church buildings in Australia